Liberal radicalism may refer to:
 Radicalism (historical), a variant of liberalism emerging in several European and Latin American countries in the 19th century, advocating universal suffrage and other democratic rights.
 Social liberalism, a more left-leaning variant of European liberalism, culturally progressive and economically interventionist.